Richard Clement (10 June 1832 – 29 October 1873) was an English first-class cricketer and civil servant.

Richard Clement was the son of Hampden Clement - who was an English landowner who had been educated at Exeter College, Oxford - and of Philippa Cobham Alleyne. He was born in June 1832 at Snarestone, Leicestershire. His paternal grandfather was Richard Clement, who a Dutch owner of sugar plantations. He was the nephew of Martha Clement, who was the wife of Colonel Thomas Moody, Kt., who named a son, Hampden Clement Blamire Moody, after Richard Clement's father, and through whom he was related to Major-General Richard Clement Moody, who was the founder and the first Lieutenant-Governor of British Columbia.

Clement was educated at Rugby School, and at University College, Oxford, whilst at which he in 1853 appeared twice in first-class cricket for Oxford University, once against the Marylebone Cricket Club and once against Cambridge University. After graduating from Oxford, Clement was employed as a clerk at the Treasury. He died accidentally while on a hunt on 29 October 1873 near Bicester. His younger brother, Reynold, also played first-class cricket.

References

External links

1832 births
1873 deaths
People from North West Leicestershire District
Cricketers from Leicestershire
English people of Dutch descent
People educated at Rugby School
Alumni of University College, Oxford
English cricketers
Oxford University cricketers
English civil servants
Accidental deaths in England
Hunting accident deaths